is a Japanese actor. He is best known for his roles as Sekime Kyogo in the drama Hanazakari no Kimitachi e and as Takuma Kakinouchi in the 2009 film I Give My First Love to You.

Filmography

Films
 The Foreign Duck, the Native Duck and God in a Coin Locker (2007)
 Tennen Kokekkō (2007)
 Robo Rock (2007)
 Someday's Dreamers (2008)
 I Give My First Love to You, as Takuma Kakinouchi (2009)
 Honokaa Boy (2009)
 Juryoku Pierrot (Gravity Clown) (2009)
 Harufuwei / Halfway (2009)
 Akunin (2010)
 Confessions (2010)
 Piecing Me Back Together (2010)
 Raiou (2010)
 Princess Toyotomi (2011), as Asahi Gainsbourg
 Life Back Then (2011), as Kyohei Nagashima
 Akko-chan: The Movie (Himitsu no Akko-chan) (2012), as Naoto Hayase
 Space Brothers (2012), as Hibito Nanba
 Beyond the Memories (2013), as Roku Akazawa
 Mourning Recipe (2013), as Haru
 The Great Shu Ra Ra Boom (2015), as Ryosuke Hinode
 Oh! Father! (2014), as Yukio
 April Fools (2015)
 Strayer's Chronicle (2015)
 Himitsu – Top Secret (2016), as Ikkou Aoki
 Someone (2016), as Takayoshi
 Gin Tama (2017), as Kotaro Katsura
 JoJo's Bizarre Adventure: Diamond Is Unbreakable Chapter I (2017), as Keicho Nijimura
 The Many Faces of Ito (2018), as Seijirō Itō
 Family Story (2018), as Takuya Kobayashi
 Gin Tama 2 (2018), as Kotaro Katsura
 Restaurant from the Sky (2019)
 Under the Stars (2020), as Minami
 The Night Beyond the Tricornered Window (2021), as Rihito Hiyakawa
 Drive My Car (2021), Kōji Takatsuki
 Cube (2021)
 Arc (2021)
 The Cursed Sanctuary X (2021), Teruo Yamada
 My Missing Valentine (2023), Hajime

Television
 Seishun Energy (Fuji TV, 2006), 
 Dear Students! as Kaori Kinoshita (TV Asahi, 2007)
 Hana-Kimi as Kyogo Sekime (Fuji TV, 2007)
 The Negotiator (TV Asahi, 2008), episode 5
 Fukidemono to Imoto (TV Asahi, 2008)
 Homeroom on the Beachside as Hiroki Negishi (Fuji TV, 2008)
 Otomen (live action) as Masumune Asuka,(Fuji TV, 2009), Masamune Asuka
 Wagaya no Rekishi (Fuji TV, 2010)
 The Golden Piggy   as Kudo Suguru (NTV, 2010)
 Young Black Jack (NTV, 2011), live-action based on Osamu Tezuka's 'Black Jack' manga as the young Black Jack (Hazama Kurou)
 Taira no Kiyomori as Minamoto no Yoritomo (NHK, 2012)
 The Holy Monsters as Kengo Shiba (TV Asahi, 2012)
 Future Diary as Arata Hoshino (Fuji TV, 2012)
 Legal High 2 as Haruki Hanyū (Fuji TV, 2013)
 ST MPD Scientific Investigation Squad as Tomohisa Yurine (NTV, 2014)
 Unhandy Handyman as Jun Takeyama (TV Tokyo, 2015)
 The Memorandum of Kyoko Okitegami as Yakusuke Kakushidate (NTV, 2015)
 We're Millennials Got a Problem? as Masakazu Sakama (NTV, 2016)
 Kizuna: Hashire Kiseki no Kouma as Takuma Matsushita (NHK, 2017)
 The Supporting Actors as himself cameo (TV Tokyo, 2017)
 Little Giants as Haruhiko Yamada (TBS, 2017)
 Meishi Game as X  (Wowow, 2017)
 The Many Faces of Ito (2017, TBS) as Seijirō Itō episode 7-8 
 The Supporting Actors 2 (2018, TV Tokyo)
 Descending Stories: Showa Genroku Rakugo Shinju as Yūrakutei Yakumo VIII (Kikuhiko) (NHK G, 2018) 
 Natsuzora as Saitarō Okuhara (NHK, 2019)
 Talio: Avenger Buddies as Kensuke Kuroiwa (NHK, 2020)
 Can't Write!?: Screenwriter Keisuke Yoshimaru's Life Without as (TV Asahi, 2021)
 My Dear Exes (Omameda Towako to Sannin no Motootto) as Shinshin Nakamura (Fuji TV, 2021)

Music videos
 "Negaiboshi" by Showta, 2006
 "Ashita, Mata" by Alexandros, 2017

Awards
 34th Hochi Film Awards : Best New Artist (2009)
 22nd Nikkan Sports Film Awards : Best Newcomer (2009)
 52nd Blue Ribbon Awards : Best Newcomer(2010)
 54th Elan d'or Awards : Newcomer of the Year (2010)
 33rd Japan Academy Prize : Newcomer of the Year (2010)
 31st Yokohama Film Festival : Best Newcomer (2010)
 14th Confidence Award Drama Prize : Leading Actor Award (2018)

References

External links
Official profile on Stardust Promotion

1989 births
Living people
Japanese male film actors
Japanese male television actors
Stardust Promotion artists
Japanese male child actors
Japanese male voice actors
Male actors from Tokyo
21st-century Japanese male actors